Dante Cesare DiPaolo (February 18, 1926 – September 4, 2013) was an American dancer and actor. Sometimes, he also appeared under the name of Dante De Paulo, Dante D' Paulo, and Dante Di Paola.

Biography
The son of an immigrant miner from Italy, DiPaolo started his career as a dancer when he was a child; he was nicknamed "the whirlwind of Colorado." At 13, he starred opposite Bing Crosby in The Star Maker, his first small film role; in 1945 he starred with Judy Garland in Ziegfeld Follies. From 1948 to 1950, he played in various Broadway shows.

In the 1950s he worked as a dancer, mainly in Las Vegas, and married a showgirl. The couple moved to Europe and for several years lived in Rome, where DiPaolo continued acting in films.

By 1973, DiPaolo was divorced and became romantically involved with singer Rosemary Clooney, whom he met in Hollywood during the late 1940s. The two married in November 1997. and the marriage lasted until the death of Clooney in 2002.

On September 4, 2013, DiPaolo died of pneumonia in Los Angeles at the age of 87.

Selected filmography
 The Star Maker (1939)
 Chip Off the Old Block (1944)
 Ziegfeld Follies (1945)
 Meet Me at the Fair (1953)
 Seven Brides for Seven Brothers  (1954)
 Cha-Cha-Cha-Boom! (1956)
 Giuseppe venduto dai fratelli (1960)
 Maciste nella terra dei ciclopi (1961)
 Maciste alla corte del Gran Khan (1961)
 Pontius Pilate (1962)
 Venus Against the Son of Hercules (1963)
 The Girl Who Knew Too Much (1963)
 Carmen di Trastevere (1963)
 Blood and Black Lace (1964)
 Sweet Charity (1969)

References

External links
 
 Dante DiPaolo at rosemaryclooney.com
 Dante DiPaolo web
 

1926 births
2013 deaths
American people of Italian descent
American male dancers
Male actors from Colorado
American male film actors
American male stage actors
Deaths from pneumonia in California
People from Weld County, Colorado